The Tartessian language is the extinct Paleo-Hispanic language of inscriptions in the Southwestern script found in the southwest of the Iberian Peninsula, mainly in the south of Portugal (Algarve and southern Alentejo), and the southwest of Spain (south of Extremadura and western Andalusia). There are 95 such inscriptions, the longest having 82 readable signs. Around one third of them were found in Early Iron Age necropolises or other Iron Age burial sites associated with rich complex burials. It is usual to date them to the 7th century BC and to consider the southwestern script to be the most ancient Paleo-Hispanic script, with characters most closely resembling specific Phoenician letter forms found in inscriptions dated to c. 825 BC. Five of the inscriptions occur on stelae with what has been interpreted as Late Bronze Age carved warrior gear from the Urnfield culture.

Name 
Most researchers use the term Tartessian to refer to the language as attested on the stelae written in the Southwestern script, but some researchers would prefer to reserve the term Tartessian for the language of the core Tartessian zone, which is attested for those researchers with some archaeological graffiti – like the Huelva graffito and maybe with some stelae such as Villamanrique de la Condesa (J.52.1). Such researchers consider that the language of the inscriptions found outside the core Tartessian zone would be either a different language or maybe a Tartessian dialect and so they would prefer to identify the language of the stelae with a different title: "southwestern" or "south-Lusitanian". There is general agreement that the core area of Tartessos is around Huelva, extending to the valley of the Guadalquivir, but the area under Tartessian influence is much wider (see maps). Three of the 95 stelae and some graffiti, belong to the core area: Alcalá del Río (Untermann J.53.1), Villamanrique de la Condesa (J.52.1) and Puente Genil (J.51.1). Four have also been found in the Middle Guadiana (in Extremadura), and the rest have been found in the south of Portugal (Algarve and Lower Alentejo), where the Greek and Roman sources locate the pre-Roman Cempsi and Sefes and Cynetes peoples.

History 
The most confident dating is for the Tartessian inscription (J.57.1) in the necropolis at Medellín, Badajoz, Spain to 650/625 BC. Further confirmatory dates for the Medellín necropolis include painted ceramics of the 7th–6th centuries BC.

In addition, a graffito on a Phoenician shard dated to the early to mid 7th century BC and found at the Phoenician settlement of Doña Blanca near Cadiz has been identified as Tartessian by the shape of the signs. It is only two signs long, reading ]tetu[ or perhaps ]tute[. It does not show the syllable-vowel redundancy more characteristic of the southwestern script, but it is possible that this developed as indigenous scribes adapted the script from archaic Phoenician and other such exceptions occur (Correa and Zamora 2008).

The script used in the mint of Salacia (Alcácer do Sal, Portugal) from around 200 BC may be related to the Tartessian script, though it has no syllable-vowel redundancy; violations of this are known, but it is not clear if the language of this mint corresponds with the language of the stelae (de Hoz 2010).

The Turdetani of the Roman period are generally considered the heirs of the Tartessian culture. Strabo mentions that: "The Turdetanians are ranked as the wisest of the Iberians; and they make use of an alphabet, and possess records of their ancient history, poems, and laws written in verse that are six thousand years old, as they assert." It is not known when Tartessian ceased to be spoken, but Strabo (writing c. 7 BC) records that "The Turdetanians ... and particularly those that live about the Baetis, have completely changed over to the Roman mode of life; with most of the populace not even remembering their own language any more."

Writing 

Tartessian inscriptions are in the Southwestern script, which is also known as the Tartessian or South Lusitanian script. Like all other Paleo-Hispanic scripts, except for the Greco-Iberian alphabet, Tartessian uses syllabic glyphs for plosive consonants and alphabetic letters for other consonants. Thus, it is a mixture of an alphabet and a syllabary that is called a semi-syllabary. Some researchers believe these scripts are descended solely from the Phoenician alphabet, but others think that the Greek alphabet had an influence as well.

The Tartessian script is very similar to the Southeastern Iberian script, both in the shapes of the signs and in their values. The main difference is that the Southeastern Iberian script does not redundantly mark the vocalic values of syllabic characters, which was discovered by Ulrich Schmoll and allows the classification of most of the characters into vowels, consonants and syllabic characters. As of the 1990s, the decipherment of the script was largely complete and so the sound values of most of the characters are known.

Tartessian is written in scriptio continua, which complicates the identification of individual words.

Classification 
Tartessian is generally left unclassified for lack of data or proposed to be a language isolate for lack of connections to the Indo-European languages. Some Tartessian names have been interpreted as Indo-European, more specifically as Celtic. However, the language as a whole remains inexplicable from the Celtic or Indo-European point of view; the structure of Tartessian syllables appears to be incompatible with Celtic or even Indo-European phonetics and more compatible with Iberian or Basque; some scholars consider that all Celtic elements are borrowings.

Since 2009, John T. Koch has argued that Tartessian is a Celtic language and that the texts can be translated. Koch's thesis has been popularised by the BBC TV series The Celts: Blood, Iron and Sacrifice and the associated book by Alice Roberts. 

Although others such as Terrence Kaufman have suggested that Tartessian may be a Celtic language, this proposal is widely rejected by linguists. The current academic consensus regarding the classification of Tartessian as a Celtic language is summarized by de Hoz:

Texts 
(The following are examples of Tartessian inscriptions. Untermann's numbering system, or location name in newer transcriptions, is cited in brackets, e.g. (J.19.1) or (Mesas do Castelinho). Transliterations are by Rodríguez Ramos [2000].)

Mesas do Castelinho (Almodôvar) 
 
 
 
 

This is the longest Tartessian text known at present, with 82 signs, 80 of which have an identifiable phonetic value. The text is complete if it is assumed that the damaged portion contains a common, if poorly-understood, Tartessian phrase-form .

Fonte Velha (Bensafrim) (J.53.1)
 

Herdade da Abobada (Almodôvar) (J.12.1)
 
In the texts above, there are repetition of -, -, tᶤile-, bᵒoii-, -tᵉero-, kᵃaltᵉe-, lok-, -ᵒonii, whereas bᵒoii tᵉero- repeats three times, with assumably rero corruption of tᵉero in Mesas do Castelinho transcription. tᶤile- appears in the beginning of the sentence, which might imply, that in: 

Mesas do Castelinho: Tᶤile kᵘuṟkᵘuarkᵃas tᵃa ḇᵘutᵉebᵃan. Tᶤile bᵒoii tᵉero bᵃare naŕkᵉe aφiuuliieianii. Tᵃa eanira Kᵃaltᵉe. Tᵃa obᵉesaru[?]an. 

Fonte Velha: Logo boniirabotoaŕaiai galte, logo nanenaŕeŋaginśiiugolo boii tero bare betasiioonii.

Herdade da Abobada: iŕualkᵘusiel naŕkᵉen tᶤimubᵃa tᵉero bᵃare-[?]ᵃa. Tᵃa ne atᵉe.

See also 
 Arganthonios
 Celtiberian language
 Gallaecian language
 Hispano-Celtic languages
 National Museum of Archaeology (Portugal)
 Pre-Roman peoples of the Iberian Peninsula
 Continental Celtic languages

References

Further reading 
 Ballester, Xaverio (2004): «Hablas indoeuropeas y anindoeuropeas en la Hispania prerromana», Estudios de lenguas y epigrafía antiguas – ELEA 6, pp. 107–138.
 Broderick, George (2010): «Das Handbuch der Eurolinguistik», Die vorrömischen Sprachen auf der iberischen Halbinsel, pp. 304–305
 
 Correa, José Antonio (1992): «La epigrafía tartesia», Andalusien zwischen Vorgeshichte und Mittelalter, eds. D. Hertel & J. Untermann, pp. 75–114.
 Correa, José Antonio (1995): «Reflexiones sobre la epigrafía paleohispánica del suroeste de la Península Ibérica», Tartessos 25 años después, pp. 609–618.
 
 Correa, José Antonio, Zamora, José Ángel (2008): «Un graffito tartessio hallado en el yacimiento del Castillo do Dona Blanca», Palaeohispanica 8, pp. 179–196.
 Correia, Virgílio-Hipólito (1996): «A escrita pré-romana do Sudoeste peninsular», De Ulisses a Viriato: o primeiro milenio a.c., pp. 88–94.
 Eska, Joseph (2013): Review: "John T. Koch, Barry W. Cunliffe (ed.), Celtic from the West 2: Rethinking the Bronze Age and the Arrival of Indo-European in Atlantic Europe. Celtic studies publications, 16. Oxford; Oakville, CT: Oxbow Books, 2013". Bryn Mawr Classical Review 2013.12.35.
 Eska, Joseph (2014): «Comments on John T. Koch’s Tartessian-as-Celtic Enterprise», Journal of Indo-European Studies 42/3-4, pp. 428–438.
 Gorrochategui, Joaquín (2013): “Hispania Indoeuropea y no Indoeuropea”, in Iberia e Sardegna: Legami linguistici, archeologici e genetici dal Mesolitico all’Età del Bronzo - Proceedings of the International Congress «Gorosti U5b3» (Cagliari-Alghero, June 12–16, 2012), pp. 47–64.
 Guerra, Amilcar (2002): «Novos monumentos epigrafados com escrita do Sudoeste da vertente setentrional da Serra do Caldeirão», Revista Portuguesa de arqueologia 5-2, pp. 219–231.
 
 Guerra, Amilcar (2013): “Algumas questões sobre as escritas pré-romanas do Sudoeste Hispánico”, in Acta Palaeohispanica XI: Actas del XI coloquio internacional de lenguas y culturas prerromanas de la Península Ibérica (Valencia, 24-27 de octubre de 2012) (Palaeohispanica 13), pp. 323–345.
 Hoz, Javier de (1995): «Tartesio, fenicio y céltico, 25 años después», Tartessos 25 años después, pp. 591–607.
 Hoz, Javier de (2007): «Cerámica y epigrafía paleohispánica de fecha prerromana», Archivo Español de Arqueología 80, pp. 29–42.
 Hoz, Javier de (2010): Historia lingüística de la Península Ibérica en la antigüedad: I. Preliminares y mundo meridional prerromano, Madrid, CSIC, coll. « Manuales y anejos de Emerita ».
 Koch, John T. (2010): «Celtic from the West Chapter 9: Paradigm Shift? Interpreting Tartessian as Celtic», Oxbow Books, Oxford,  pp. 187–295.
 Koch, John T. (2011): «Tartessian 2: The Inscription of Mesas do Castelinho ro and the Verbal Complex. Preliminaries to Historical Phonology», Oxbow Books, Oxford,  pp. 1–198.
 Koch, John T. (2011): «The South-Western (SW) Inscriptions and the Tartessos of Archaeology of History», Tarteso, El emporio del Metal, Huelva.
 Koch, John T. (2013): «Celtic from the West 2 Chapter 4: Out of the Flow and Ebb of the European Bronze Age: Heroes, Tartessos, and Celtic», Oxbow Books, Oxford,  pp. 101–146.
 Koch, John T. (2014a): «On the Debate over the Classification of the Language of the South-Western (SW) Inscriptions, also known as Tartessian», Journal of Indo-European Studies 42/3-4, pp. 335–427.
 Koch, John T. (2014b): «A Decipherment Interrupted: Proceeding from Valério, Eska, and Prósper», Journal of Indo-European Studies 42/3-4, pp. 487–524.
 Mederos, Alfredo; Ruiz, Luis (2001): «Los inicios de la escritura en la Península ibérica. Grafitos en cerámicas del bronce final III y fenicias», Complutum 12, pp. 97–112.
 Mikhailova, T. A. (2010) Review: "J.T. Koch. Tartessian: Celtic in the South-West at the Dawn of history (Celtic Studies Publication XIII). Aberystwyth: Centre for advanced Welsh and Celtic studies, 2009" Вопросы языкознания 2010 №3; 140-155.
 Prósper, Blanca M. (2014): "Some Observations on the Classification of Tartessian as a Celtic Language". Journal of Indo-European Studies 42/3-4, pp. 468–486.
 Rodríguez Ramos, Jesús (2000): “La lectura de las inscripciones sudlusitano-tartesias”. Faventia 22/1, pp 21–48.
 Rodríguez Ramos, Jesús (2002a): “El origen de la escritura sudlusitano-tartesia y la formación de alfabetos a partir de alefatos”. Rivista di Studi Fenici 30/2, pp. 187–216.
 Rodríguez Ramos, Jesús (2002b): "Las inscripciones sudlusitano-tartesias: su función, lingua y contexto socioeconómico". Complutum 13, pp. 85–95.
 Rodríguez Ramos, Jesús (2009): «La lengua sudlusitana», Studia Indogermanica Lodziensia VI, pp. 83–98.
 Valério, Miguel (2008 [2009]): “Origin and Development of the Paleohispanic scripts: The Orthography and Phonology of the Southwestern Alphabet". Revista Portuguesa de Arqueologia 11-2, pp. 107–138. 
 Valério, Miguel (2014): "The Interpretative Limits of the Southwestern Script". Journal of Indo-European Studies 42/3-4, pp. 439–467.
 
 
 
 Wikander, Stig (1966): «Sur la langue des inscriptions Sud-Hispaniques», in Studia Linguistica 20, 1966, pp. 1–8.
 Wodtko, Dagmar (2021). "De Ortografía Tartésica". In: Palaeohispanica. Revista Sobre Lenguas Y Culturas De La Hispania Antigua 21 (diciembre), pp. 219–234. https://doi.org/10.36707/palaeohispanica.v21i0.411.

Paleohispanic languages
Extinct languages of Europe
Unclassified languages of Europe
Tartessos
Ancient Portugal
Extinct languages of Spain
Phoenician alphabet